Francklyn is a surname. Notable people with the surname include:

Charles G. Francklyn (1844–1929), British-American industrialist in New York society
John Francklyn ( 1564–1645), English politician

See also
Francklin
Franklyn (name)